The 2007 Belgian Figure Skating Championships took place between 24 and 25 November 2006 in Hasselt. Skaters competed in the disciplines of men's and ladies' singles.

One skater from United Kingdom competed as guest skater and her results were discounted from the final results.

Senior results

Men

Ladies
Jenna McCorkell of United Kingdom finished 2nd with a total of 112.73 points, but is not included with the results.

External links
 results

Belgian Figure Skating Championships
2006 in figure skating
Belgian Figure Skating Championships, 2007